Lytle is a city in Atascosa, Bexar, and Medina counties in the U.S. state of Texas.  The population was 2,492 at the 2010 census.  It is part of the San Antonio Metropolitan Statistical Area.

History

Lytle grew out of 321 acres located around the head of Atascosa Creek which were patented to Henry Volkner in 1856. Volkner was the assignee of Mahan Matter, and the patent was signed by Elisha M. Pease, Governor of Texas. In 1870, Volkner sold the 321 acres for $175 to Fitch S. Adams. Lytle's first school  was built on Adams' property with a verbal agreement that as long as the school building was there, the land on which it stood would belong to the school.

In 1881, officials from the International–Great Northern Railroad made an agreement with B. G. Andrews in which he was to give land for a new station ("Andrews Station"). There was some misunderstanding in making the deed, and the dispute ended with Mr. Andrews refusing to submit the property deed. Traildriver and cattleman Captain John Thomas Lytle (1844–1907) then secured land some three miles southwest of Andrews Station, and one morning in 1882 railroad employees loaded Andrews Station on two flat cars and moved it to the present site near the Lytle-McDaniel Ranch, which became known as Lytle or Lytle Station. When a post office was granted in 1883, the town also consisted of a general store, a bar, and a casketmaker named W. J. Garnand, who also became the first postmaster. An undated newspaper clipping entitled "Pioneer of Lytle" reads, "...W. J. Garnand was the first man to locate in the town of Lytle.  That was in 1883.  He was the first postmaster there and has been a leading citizen all the time."

In 1884, Lytle had a population of fifty and the town included a union church, a district school, a hotel, and a physician. By 1892 the population doubled and grown to include four general stores, two livestock breeders, and a Methodist church. Lytle's early settlers were primarily engaged in farming and in raising cattle. Over time, Lytle became a major shipping point for cattle, and for years the old stock pens and loading chute were familiar landmarks until they were removed in the late 1960's and early 1970's. Cotton and corn were also two important crops, and cotton gins were located in both Lytle and in now-abandoned Benton City. In the late 1890s, coal mining also contributed to the local economy. By 1896, the population had risen to 150. By 1914 the town had grown to include telephone service, another general store, two lumberyards, and a weekly newspaper called The Herald, and the population had grown to 600. Lytle School had 127 students. During the Great Depression, the school was enlarged as part of a WPA project.

After World War II, the Chamber of Commerce raised enough money together with property owner participation to pave the streets. Later, a pitch by W. C. Loessberg and a group of volunteers led to the town being incorporated on October 27, 1951. On May 28, 1955, a bond election was passed to drill the Edwards well for city water service, and the Lytle Volunteer Fire Department was also founded that year. Another bond election passed to give the city a gas system in 1960, and a sewer system in 1961. More streets were paved in 1971, and a garbage removal and ambulance service were added in 1974. Since that time, the city has continued to grow.

Geography
Lytle is located in the northern corner of Atascosa County.  Most of the city lies in Atascosa County; only small portions extend into Bexar and Medina counties.

Interstate 35 passes through the southeast part of the city, with access from Exit 131. Lytle's Main Street is Texas State Highway 132, following the route of the former U.S. Route 81 southwest to Natalia and Devine, before rejoining I-35.

Climate
The area's climate is characterized by hot, humid summers and generally mild to cool winters.  According to the Köppen Climate Classification system, Lytle has a humid subtropical climate.

Demographics

2020 census

As of the 2020 United States census, there were 2,914 people, 760 households, and 577 families residing in the city.

2000 census
As of the census of 2000, there were 2,383 people, 811 households, and 633 families residing in the city. The population density was 593.4 people per square mile (228.9/km). There were 898 housing units at an average density of 223.6/sq mi (86.2/km). The racial makeup of the city was 73.81% White, 0.46% African American, 0.92% Native American, 0.29% Asian, 0.04% Pacific Islander, 21.57% from other races, and 2.90% from two or more races. Hispanic or Latino of any race were 61.18% of the population.
There were 811 households, out of which 39.6% had children under the age of 18 living with them, 60.8% were married couples living together, 13.6% had a female householder with no male householder present, and 21.9% were non-families. 19.9% of all households were made up of individuals, and 9.4% had someone living alone who was 65 years of age or older. The average household size was 2.94 and the average family size was 3.38.

In the city, the population was spread out, with 30.5% under the age of 18, 9.3% from 18 to 24, 26.6% from 25 to 44, 21.4% from 45 to 64, and 12.2% who were 65 years of age or older. The median age was 34 years. For every 100 females, there were 91.6 males. For every 100 females age 18 and over, there were 85.1 males.

The median income for a household in the city was $34,857, and the median income for a family was $40,699. Males had a median income of $27,734 versus $21,129 for females. The per capita income for the city was $14,826. About 15.0% of families and 16.6% of the population were below the poverty line, including 21.8% of those under age 18 and 20.0% of those age 65 or over.

Education
The Lytle Independent School District serves almost all of Lytle and is home to the Lytle High School Pirates.  A small sliver of Lytle (the portion in Bexar County) is served by the Southwest Independent School District. Another portion is in the Natalia Independent School District.

In popular culture
English artist Cornelia Parker retrieved charcoal from a Baptist church which had been struck by lightning in Lytle and reassembled the pieces in her 1997 installation, Mass (Colder Darker Matter), which was displayed in the Frith Street Gallery in London, England.

Gallery

References

External links
City of Lytle official website
Lytle Chamber of Commerce

Cities in Atascosa County, Texas
Cities in Bexar County, Texas
Cities in Medina County, Texas
Cities in Texas
Greater San Antonio